The 2020 FIG World Cup circuit in Artistic Gymnastics is a series of competitions officially organized and promoted by the International Gymnastics Federation (FIG) in 2020. A number of events were originally scheduled to take place in 2020 and serve as opportunities for gymnasts to earn points towards Olympic qualification. However, the organization of many events was heavily affected by the worldwide COVID-19 pandemic, resulting in either cancelation or postponement of some events to 2021.

Two of the Apparatus World Cup series competitions (Melbourne and Baku), as well as the American Cup All-Around World Cup in Milwaukee, were held and counted towards Olympic qualification through the FIG Artistic Gymnastics World Cup series route. Additionally, the Szombathely World Challenge Cup was the sole representative of the World Challenge Cup series staged in 2020, and did not affect the ranking for Olympic qualification.

Schedule

World Cup series

Note
1.Canceled midway due to the COVID-19 pandemic in Azerbaijan. Results of the qualification stage were considered as the final rankings.

World Challenge Cup series

Events canceled or postponed

Medalists

Men

World Cup series

All-Around
The three federations who earn the most points through the Individual All-Around World Cups will earn an additional Olympic spot in addition to their 4-person team.  Whoever places first earns 60 points for their country and each subsequent placement is five less points. The total points earned is the summation of total points from all four events in the series. Three events in the series were moved to 2021 due to the global COVID-19 pandemic.

Apparatus
An athlete can earn Olympic qualification points at each Apparatus World Cup in 2020.  The athlete who earned the spot on each apparatus will be announced after the conclusion of the Doha World Cup, which was moved to 2021 due to the global COVID-19 pandemic.

World Challenge Cup series
One event in the series was canceled, and four other events were moved to 2021 due to the global COVID-19 pandemic.

Women

World Cup series

All-Around
The three federations who earn the most points through the Individual All-Around World Cups will earn an additional Olympic spot in addition to their 4-person team.  Whoever places first earns 60 points for their country and each subsequent placement is five less points. The total points earned is the summation of total points from all four events in the series. Three events in the series were moved to 2021 due to the global COVID-19 pandemic.

Apparatus
An athlete can earn Olympic qualification points at each Apparatus World Cup in 2020.  The athlete who earned the spot on each apparatus will be announced after the conclusion of the Doha World Cup, which was moved to 2021 due to the global COVID-19 pandemic.

World Challenge Cup series
One event in the series was canceled, and four other events were moved to 2021 due to the global COVID-19 pandemic.

Medal table

Overall

See also
 2021 FIG Artistic Gymnastics World Cup series

References

FIG Artistic Gymnastics World Cup Series, 2020
Artistic Gymnastics World Cup